Carruthers Creek may refer to:

 Carruthers Creek (Australia), a tributary of Blue Lake Creek, itself a tributary of Snowy River
 Carruthers Creek (Canada), a tributary of Lake Ontario